25 ta Life is an American New York hardcore band that originally formed in mid-1991.

History 
The band was started by Frank Smarra (bass) and Harry Minas (drums) in Astoria, Queens, New York City. They were soon joined by Fred Mesk (guitar) and together wrote most of the material that would be on their early releases.

In early 1992, they recruited former Agnostic Front roadie Rick Healey who added the lyrics to all the songs. They adopted the name after it was suggested by Freddy Cricien from Madball that also helped by giving them guest appearances at the end of its sets. 25 ta Life played their first full show at Studio 1, New Jersey on May 10, 1993, supporting Obituary. After a few failed attempts to add a second guitar player, Steve Pettit (formally of Dmize) joined the band in late 1993. In January 1994, bassist and co-founding member Frank left the band due to family commitments and was replaced by Warren Lee from Out of Line Queens. Steve was later replaced by his partner in Dmize: Beto Rosario. The band continued to play a large number of shows in the tri-state area and up and down the East Coast. In early 1996, 25 ta Life travelled to Europe, playing in France, Italy, Germany, Austria, Belgium, and Poland for the first time. By late 1996, co-founding member Harry left the band and was replaced by Seth Meyer from One 4 One.

25 ta Life opened for Agnostic Front's reunion show at the Wetlands in December 1996 and then played all of AF's East Coast dates along with Madball, Hatebreed and H2O in early 1997. They went to Japan in April 1997. Warren and Beto left in May 1997 after the West Coast tour. Mike H from One 4 One joined on bass in June 1997 and they went to Europe in July 1997. They recorded "Strength Through Unity..." in July 1997, writing half of it on the spot. "Loyal ta the Grave", featuring Freddy (Madball) and Lord Ezec (Crown of Thornz, Skarhead), was written and recorded in less than an hour. Mike left in August 1997 and was replaced by Dave Urban from Faction Zero. Later that month, they went to Puerto Rico and recorded two songs for the second "New York's Hardest" compilation. In October–November 1997, Biohazard took 25 ta Life on a short eight-show tour of the East Coast from Washington, D.C., to Boston. Seth left the band in February 1998 and was replaced by Rob Pallotta. The band recorded its first full-length album "Friendship, Loyalty, Commitment" in 1999.   After years of touring, the band broke up in late 2000.

Rick reformed the band in 2002 with all new members.  They released several albums with different lineups over the next few years. The band eventually stopped releasing new albums and playing shows as rumors of Rick's mental illness began to spread.

In 2017, Fred Mesk, Seth Meyer, Beto and Mike 141 reformed the band with Stikman from Fury of Five on vocals.  They performed at This is Hardcore fest in Philadelphia on July 29, 2017.  They also announced on their Facebook page that they are working on new material.  In March 2018, 25 ta Life released three new songs (Hunting Season EP) online.  They also went on a short European tour which included headlining the sold out Superbowl of Hardcore in Rennes, France.

Members

 Current members
James "Stikman" Ismean – vocals
Seth Meyer – drums
Fred Mesk – rhythm guitar
Mike "141" Heinzer – bass 
Rob "Beto" Rosario – lead guitar

 Former members
Rick "Rick ta Life" – vocals
Goulax – guitars
Steve Pettit – guitars
Mark da Fist – guitars
Shawn – guitars
Ezra van Buskirk – guitars
Chris Manning – guitars
Jackson "Ta Life" Bunz - guitars
Frank Smarra – bass
Warren Lee – bass
Dave Urban – bass
Loco Matt – bass
Erick Hernández – bass
Chumley – bass
Dobro Hristov – bass
Simon Doucet – drums
Scott Bartley – drums
Harry Minas – drums
Rob Pallotta – drums
Justin Skamz Strickland – drums
Justin The Jew – drums
Pete DeRosso – drums
Erwan Herry – ?

Discography

Studio albums

EPs

Splits

Live album

Compilations

References

Hardcore punk groups from New York (state)
Triple Crown Records artists
Good Life Recordings artists